Xyroptila elegans is a moth of the family Pterophoridae. It is found in north-eastern New Guinea and Australia.

References

External links

Moths described in 2006
Moths of Australia
elegans
Moths of New Guinea